Karl Baumgartner (1949 – 18 March 2014) was a German film producer. He worked on more than 70 films between 1991 and 2014.

Selected filmography
 Life on a String (1991)
 Underground (1995)
 Dance of the Wind (1997)
 Black Cat, White Cat (1998)
 Luna Papa (1999)
 Mostly Martha (2001)
 The Suit (2003 film) (2003)
 Spring, Summer, Fall, Winter... and Spring (2003)
 Stratosphere Girl (2004)
 You Am I (2006)
 The World Is Big and Salvation Lurks Around the Corner (2008)
 Teza (2008)
 The Light Thief (2010)
 Waiting for the Sea (2012)
 Clouds of Sils Maria (2014)

References

External links

1949 births
2014 deaths
German film producers
People from Bruneck